GLG may refer to:

Gerson Lehrman Group
Glengarnock railway station, Scotland, National Rail station code
GLG Partners
The Great Lakes Group
GLG Grand
Gmeinder Lokomotivenfabrik GmbH, part of the Gmeinder company